The Hy-Vee Triathlon (now known as the Des Moines Triathlon) was an Olympic-distance triathlon race held in Des Moines, Iowa, USA. From 2011–2014, the race served as the World Triathlon Corporation's 5150 Series U.S. Championships. Previously, it was part of the ITU Triathlon World Cup series from 2008 to 2010. 
The annual triathlon event attracted many of the top professional triathletes in the world due, in part, to having the largest prize purse awarded for Olympic-distance races in the sport (and from 2008–12, the largest in the sport overall). In addition to professional triathletes, the triathlon event features competition among amateur athletes as well.

History
The first edition of the event, held June 17, 2007, featured the largest prize in triathlon history, at $200,000 each for the men's and women's elite winners through organizer and presenting sponsor Hy-Vee, a regional grocer. Approximately 10,000 spectators came downtown to the event, which was held in downtown Des Moines, swimming at Gray's Lake and finishing at the Iowa State Capitol.

The 2008 edition, held June 22, served as the final United States qualifier for the 2008 Summer Olympics in Beijing, China. Due to flooding, it was moved to West Des Moines. Initially, there was uncertainty about its Olympic-qualifying status, as bacteria levels in nearby Blue Heron Lake left the swimming option in questionable status. However, officials confirmed that there would be swimming. As part of the Olympic qualifying Hunter Kemper and Sarah Haskins claimed the final United States Olympic spots as Rasmus Henning and three-time World Champion Emma Snowsill were the overall winners.

In 2011, the World Triathlon Corporation (WTC) announced that the Hy-Vee triathlon would serve as the site for its 5150 Series U.S. Championships. The race will have the largest prize purse in triathlon, with $1 million total being paid out and $151,500 going to the men and women’s winners. The race was moved from June to Labor Day weekend and returned downtown after three years in West Des Moines.

In 2013, Hy-Vee announced that it was reducing the total purse from $1.1 million to $500,000. The men's and women's winners received $100,000 each with $20,000 going to 2nd place and $15,000 to third.

Hy-Vee opted to discontinue the event following the 2014 edition.

Premier Event Management, who formerly produced the Hy-Vee Triathlon, kept the event going as The Des Moines Triathlon in 2015-2016.

Beginning in 2017, IMG and Premier Event Management, announced that the Des Moines Triathlon is now a part of the Escape Series.

Results

Men's winners

Women's winners

References

Website
Des Moines Escape Tri

Hy-Vee
Triathlon competitions
Sports in Des Moines, Iowa
Recurring sporting events established in 2007
Triathlon competitions in the United States